This is a list of species in the genus Plagiognathus.

Plagiognathus species

 Plagiognathus alashanensis Qui and Nonnizab, 1993
 Plagiognathus albatus (Van Duzee, 1915)
 Plagiognathus albifacies Knight, 1927
 Plagiognathus alboradialis Knight, 1923
 Plagiognathus albus Reuter, 1894
 Plagiognathus alnicenatus (Knight, 1923)
 Plagiognathus alpinus (Van Duzee, 1916)
 Plagiognathus amorphae (Knight, 1930)
 Plagiognathus amurensis Reuter, 1883
 Plagiognathus annulatus Uhler, 1895
 Plagiognathus aquilinus Schuh, 2001
 Plagiognathus arbustorum (Fabricius, 1794)
 Plagiognathus astericola (Knight, 1930)
 Plagiognathus atricornis Knight, 1926
 Plagiognathus biobioensis (Carvalho, 1984)
 Plagiognathus bipunctatus Reuter, 1883
 Plagiognathus blatchleyi Reuter, 1912  (Blatchley's mirid)
 Plagiognathus brevicornis (Knight, 1929)
 Plagiognathus brevirostris Knight, 1923
 Plagiognathus brunneus (Provancher, 1872)
 Plagiognathus chrysanthemi (Wolff, 1804)  (trefoil plant bug)
 Plagiognathus cibbetsi Schuh, 2001
 Plagiognathus collaris (Matsumura, 1972)
 Plagiognathus concoloris Schuh, 2001
 Plagiognathus confusus Reuter, 1909
 Plagiognathus cornicola Knight, 1923
 Plagiognathus crocinus Knight, 1927
 Plagiognathus cuneatus Knight, 1923
 Plagiognathus davisi Knight, 1923
 Plagiognathus delicatus (Uhler, 1887)
 Plagiognathus dimorphus Schuh, 2001
 Plagiognathus dispar Knight, 1923
 Plagiognathus emarginatae Schuh, 2001
 Plagiognathus fenderi Schuh, 2001
 Plagiognathus flavicornis Knight, 1923
 Plagiognathus flavidus Knight, 1929
 Plagiognathus flavipes (Provancher, 1872)
 Plagiognathus flavoscutellatus Knight, 1923
 Plagiognathus flavus Knight, 1964
 Plagiognathus fulvaceus Knight, 1964
 Plagiognathus fulvidus Knight, 1923
 Plagiognathus fumidus (Uhler, 1875)
 Plagiognathus fusciloris Reuter, 1878
 Plagiognathus fuscipes Knight, 1929
 Plagiognathus fuscosus (Provancher, 1872)
 Plagiognathus grandis Reuter, 1876
 Plagiognathus guttatipes (Uhler, 1895)
 Plagiognathus guttulosus (Reuter, 1876)
 Plagiognathus hallucinatus Schuh, 2001
 Plagiognathus laricicola Knight, 1923
 Plagiognathus lattini Schuh, 2001
 Plagiognathus lineatus Van Duzee, 1917
 Plagiognathus lividellus Kerzhner, 1979
 Plagiognathus longipennis (Uhler, 1895)
 Plagiognathus longirostris (Knight, 1923)
 Plagiognathus lonicerae Schuh, 2001
 Plagiognathus louisianus Schuh, 2001
 Plagiognathus luteus Knight, 1929
 Plagiognathus maculipennis (Knight, 1923)
 Plagiognathus maculosus Zhao, 1996
 Plagiognathus melliferae Schuh, 2001
 Plagiognathus mexicanus Schuh, 2001
 Plagiognathus mineus (Knight, 1929)
 Plagiognathus minuendus (Knight, 1927)
 Plagiognathus modestus (Reuter, 1912)
 Plagiognathus moerens Reuter, 1909
 Plagiognathus monardellae Schuh, 2001
 Plagiognathus morrisoni (Knight, 1923)
 Plagiognathus mundus Van Duzee, 1917
 Plagiognathus negundinis Knight, 1929
 Plagiognathus nigronitens Knight, 1923
 Plagiognathus notodysmicos Schuh, 2001
 Plagiognathus obscurus Uhler, 1872  (obscure plant bug)
 Plagiognathus occipitalis Reuter, 1908
 Plagiognathus paddocki Knight, 1964
 Plagiognathus paramundus Schuh, 2001
 Plagiognathus parshleyi (Knight, 1923)
 Plagiognathus pemptos Schuh, 2001
 Plagiognathus phaceliae Schuh, 2001
 Plagiognathus phorodendronae Knight, 1929
 Plagiognathus physocarpi (Henry, 1981)
 Plagiognathus piceicola Schuh, 2001
 Plagiognathus polhemorum Schuh, 2001
 Plagiognathus politus Uhler, 1895
 Plagiognathus punctatipes Knight, 1923
 Plagiognathus reinhardi Johnston, 1935
 Plagiognathus repetitus Knight, 1923
 Plagiognathus ribesi Kelton, 1982
 Plagiognathus rideri Schuh, 2001
 Plagiognathus rileyi Schuh, 2001
 Plagiognathus rosicola Knight, 1923
 Plagiognathus rosicoloides Schuh, 2001
 Plagiognathus rubidus (Poppius, 1911)
 Plagiognathus salicicola Knight, 1929
 Plagiognathus salviae Knight, 1968
 Plagiognathus schaffneri Schuh, 2001
 Plagiognathus shepherdiae Knight, 1929
 Plagiognathus shoshonea Knight, 1964
 Plagiognathus similis Knight, 1923
 Plagiognathus stitti Knight, 1964
 Plagiognathus subovatus Knight, 1929
 Plagiognathus suffuscipennis Knight, 1923
 Plagiognathus syrticolae Knight, 1941
 Plagiognathus tenellus Knight, 1929
 Plagiognathus texanus Schuh, 2001
 Plagiognathus tinctus Knight, 1923
 Plagiognathus tsugae (Knight, 1923)
 Plagiognathus tumidifrons (Knight, 1923)
 Plagiognathus urticae Knight, 1964
 Plagiognathus verticalis (Uhler, 1894)
 Plagiognathus vitellinus (Scholtz, 1847)
 Plagiognathus viticola (Johnston, 1935)

References